This is a list of notable people from Andhra Pradesh, India, throughout history.

Independence advocates
 Alluri Sitarama Raju – revolutionary, freedom fighter, led the Rampa Rebellion of 1922-1924
 Uyyalawada Narasimha Reddy – freedom fighter, early opponent of British rule
 Vedre Ramachandra Reddy Bhoodhan – social reformer, Satyagraha Movement leader
 Gottipati Brahmaiah – freedom fighter
 Chowdary Satyanarayana - Freedom fighter, Human rights activist, Legislator
 Puchalapalli Sundaraiah – founding member of Communist Party in India
 Kalluri Chandramouli – freedom fighter
 Vavilala Gopalakrishnaya – freedom fighter
 Kaneganti Hanumanthu – freedom fighter
 Veerapandiya Kattabomman – Palaiyakkarar, early opponent of British rule
 Chandra Pulla Reddy – Communist Leader
 Gouthu Latchanna – freedom fighter
 Makineni Basavapunnaiah – Indian Communist leader
 Sarojini Naidu – freedom fighter and poet; Bengali, married to a Telugu person 
 Tanguturi Prakasam – known as "Andhra Kesari"
 Muktyala Raja – Member of Legislative Assembly, infrastructure creation in India
 N. G. Ranga – freedom fighter
 Kasinadhuni Nageswara Rao – politician
 Koratala Satyanarayana – Communist politician
 Potti Sreeramulu – revolutionary, fasted to death in protest for separate Andhra Pradesh
 Swami Ramanand Tirtha – educator and social activist
 Pingali Venkayya – designed the Indian national flag
 Kommareddi Suryanarayana - freedom activist

Reserve Bank of India Governors
 Y. Venugopal Reddy – Governor of Reserve Bank of India, 2003–2008
 Duvvuri Subbarao – Governor of Reserve Bank of India, 2008–2012

Chief Ministers
 Neelam Sanjiva Reddy – later the President of India
 Tanguturi Prakasam
 Burgula Ramakrishna Rao
 Bezawada Gopala Reddy
 Bhavanam Venkataram Reddy
 Kasu Brahmananda Reddy
 Damodaram Sanjivayya
 Kotla Vijaya Bhaskara Reddy
 Nandamuri Taraka Rama Rao
 Nadendla Bhaskara Rao
 Nedurumalli Janardhana Reddy
 Nara Chandrababu Naidu
 Y. S. Rajasekhara Reddy
 Konijeti Rosaiah
 Nallari Kiran Kumar Reddy
 Y. S. Jaganmohan Reddy

Military Chiefs
 Air Chief Marshal Denis La Fontaine – Chief of Staff, Indian Air Force, 1985–88
 Air Chief Marshal Idris Hasan Latif – Chief of Staff, Indian Air Force, 1978–81
 Air Chief Marshal Fali Homi Major – Chief of Staff, Indian Air Force, 2007–09
 General K. V. Krishna Rao,  Chief of the Army Staff (India), 1981–83

Government officials
 G. Raghava Reddy – IPS, known for innovative farming

Education
 Sarvepalli Radhakrishnan – vice-chancellor of Andhra University 
 Arjula Ramachandra Reddy – biologist, first vice-chancellor of Yogi Vemana University
 Cattamanchi Ramalinga Reddy – founder and vice-chancellor of Andhra University; Vice-chancellor of Mysore University
 G. Ram Reddy – former University Grants Commission chairman
 Vasireddy Sri Krishna – former vice-chancellor of Andhra University

Business and industry
 Kallam Anji Reddy – founder of Dr. Reddy's Laboratories
 Prathap C. Reddy – founder of Apollo Hospitals, India
 G. Pulla Reddy – businessman, philanthropist, educationist
 Gunupati Venkata Krishna Reddy – founder of GVK
 P Obul Reddy – founder of Nippo batteries
 Prem Reddy – founder of Prime Healthcare Services, which owns several hospitals in the United States
 Ramesh Gelli – founder and chairperson of the erstwhile and now defunct Global Trust Bank
 Mullapudi Harishchandra Prasad – founder of Andhra Sugars
 Byrraju Ramalinga Raju – founder of Satyam Computers
 T. Subbarami Reddy – founder of Gayatri group; philanthropist
 S. P. Y. Reddy – Chairman of Nandi Pipes, Panyam Cements and S.P.Y. Agro Industries
 Nimmagadda Prasad – founder of Chairman of Matrix Laboratories
 Lagadapati Rajagopal – founder and Chairman of Lanco Group
 Grandhi Mallikarjuna Rao – chairman, GMR Group; first Telugu person on Forbes magazine's billionaires list
 Ramoji Rao – Head of Eenadu Group, Ramoji Film city
 Rayapati Sambasiva Rao – Jayalaxmi Group of companies
 Galla Ramachandra Naidu – founder of Amar Raja Group

Science
 Raj Reddy – scientist in artificial intelligence
 U. Aswathanarayana – Honorary Director of the Mahadevan International Centre for Water Resources Management, Hyderabad
 N N Murthy –  quality and environment expert
 Yelavarthy Nayudamma – chemical engineer
 Mokshagundam Visvesvarayya – engineer
 Yellapragada Subbarow – cancer researcher
 A. S. Rao – scientist, founder of the Electronics Corporation of India Limited
 C.R.Rao – statistician and professor emeritus at Penn State University
 K.L. Rao – civil engineer, irrigation expert and political leader
 Prof. Kotcherlakota Rangadhama Rao – physicist (spectroscopy)
 Praveen Kumar Gorakavi - Chemical Engineer
 Kumar Biradha - researcher in the field of crystal engineering
 Aparajita Datta (born 1970), conservation scientist with the Nature Conservation Foundation

Artists
 Krishna Reddy – printmaker and sculptor
 Vempati Chinna Satyam – exponent of Kuchipudi dance
 Eelapata Raghuramaiah – stage and cinema actor in Andhra Pradesh
 Raja and Radha Reddy – Kuchipudi 
 Shobha Naidu – Kuchipudi
 Yamini Reddy – Kuchipudi

Musicians and dancers
 Mangalampalli Balamuralikrishna – Carnatic singer and musician
 Nataraja Ramakrishna – dance guru; revived ancient Andhra Natyam and Perini styles of dance; Chairman of Andhra Pradesh   Sangeeta Nataka Academy
 Ghantasala – playback singer of old classical Indian movies, predominantly Telugu
 Emani Sankara Sastry – Veena player of Carnatic music
 Vempati Chinna Satyam – dance guru of the Kuchipudi dance form
 S. P. Balasubrahmanyam – male singer
 Raja and Radha Reddy – Kuchipudi dancers
 Shobha Naidu – Kuchipudi dancer
 S. Janaki – female playback singer
 M. M. Keeravani – music director
 Yamini Krishnamurthy – Kuchipudi and Bharathanatyam dancer
 Dwaram Venkataswamy Naidu – violinist
 P. B. Sreenivas – playback singer
 P. Susheela – playback singer

Literature
 Gona Budda Reddy – 13th-century poet
 Vemana – Telugu poet
 Nannaya – first Telugu writer (Adi kavi), Mahabharatam in Telugu started by him, out of 18 parvas 3.5 parvas written by him
 Potana – Mahabhagavatam, Bhogini Dandakam
 Tikkana – Mahabharatam last 14 parvas written by him
 Gurazada Apparao – Telugu poet
 Gudipati Venkata Chalam – novelist
 Gurram Jashuva – Telugu poet, author, Telugu and Sanskrit scholar
 Tirupati Venkata Kavulu – two Telugu poets
 Devulapalli Krishnasastri – Telugu poet
 Tummala Seetharama Murthy – Telugu poet
 Chilakamarthi Lakshmi Narasimham – writer
 Jatavallabhula Purushottam - poet 
 Kethu Viswanatha Reddy – poet from Rayalaseema
 D.V.Narasa Raju – Telugu writer, novelist
 Kavisekhara Dr Umar Alisha – Telugu poet
 Tripuraneni Ramaswamy – playwright
 Garikapati Narasimha Rao – Avadhani
 Keshava Reddy – Telugu novelist
 M. S. Reddy – writer
 Madhunapantula Satyanarayana Sastry – Telugu poet
 Viswanatha Satyanarayana – Telugu poet
 Vasireddy Seethadevi – novelist
 Paravastu Chinnayya Soori – Telugu scholar
 Tripuraneni Gopichand – author
 Srirangam Srinivasarao – Telugu poet
 Ushasri – writer
 Sirivennela Seetharama Sastry – Telugu poet
 Dantu Muralikrishna - Writer, Singer & Scientist

Philosophers
 Jiddu Krishnamurti – philosopher
 Sri Potuluri Virabrahmendra Swami – mystic

Award winners

Bharat Ratna
 Varahagiri Venkata Giri – former President of India

Padma Vibhushan
 Cingireddy Narayana Reddy
 Akkineni Nageswara Rao
 Ravi Narayana Reddy
 Prathap C. Reddy
 Y. Venugopal Reddy
 Sarvepalli Gopal
 Kotha Satchidanda Murthy
 Padmaja Naidu
 M. Narasimham
 N. G. Ranga
 Sri Prakasa
 C. R. Rao
 Palle Rama Rao
 Kaloji Narayana Rao
 V. Kasturi Ranga Varadarja Rao – Telugu origin, born in Tamil Nadu
 Manepalli Narayana Rao Venkatachaliah
 P. Venugopal
 Mehdi Nawaz Jung
 Ali Yavar Jung
 Hafiz Mohamad Ibrahim
 C. D. Deshmukh
 Ramoji Rao

Padma Bhushan
 B.N. Reddy
 Jaggayya
 Vempati Chinna Satyam
 Raj Reddy
 Akkineni Nageshwara Rao
 Konidela Chiranjeevi
 Perugu Siva Reddy
 Daggubati Ramanaidu
 P. Susheela
 G.V.K. Reddy
 Raja and Radha Reddy
 Krishna Ghattamaneni
 K. Srinath Reddy
 Satya N. Atluri
 C.K. Nayudu
 A. S. Rao

Padma Shree
 V. Nagayya
 Cingireddy Narayana Reddy
 Eelapata Raghuramaiah
 Akkineni Nageswara Rao
 Ghantasala Venkateswar Rao
 D. Nageshwar Reddy
 K.C. Reddy
 Kallam Anji Reddy
 Perugu Siva Reddy
 S. P. Balasubrahmanyam
 Dwaram Venkataswamy Naidu
 Shobha Naidu
 Sayyid Ahmedullah Qadri
 D. V. S. Raju
 Brahmanandam
 V.V.S.Laxman
 Shobha Raju
 Nataraja Ramakrishna
 Allu Ramalingaiah
 Nandamuri Taraka Rama Rao
 Raja and Radha Reddy
 Nerella Venumadhav
 K. Viswanath
 Srikanth Kidambi

Rajiv Gandhi Khel Ratna
 Pullela Gopichand – badminton (2000–2001)
 Karnam Malleswari – weightlifting (1995–1996)
 Saina Nehwal – badminton (2009–10)

Arjuna Award
 Koneru Humpy – chess
 Sharath Kamal – table tennis
 Yousuf Khan – football
 Mukesh Kumar – hockey
 Karnam Malleswari – weightlifting
 A. Ramana Rao – volleyball
 J. J. Shobha – track and field

Dronacharya Award
 Pullela Gopichand – badminton, 2009

Member of the Order of the British Empire
 Sekhar Tam Tam – for service as District Medical Officer in the British Caribbean island of Grenada

Judges, advocates and lawyers
 K. Jayachandra Reddy
 L. Narasimha Reddy
 Subodh Markandeya
 Konda Madhava Reddy
 K. Punnaiah

Sports

Cricket
 Buchi Babu Naidu
 C.K. Nayudu
 M.S.K. Prasad
 Bharath Reddy
 Venkatapathy Raju
 Yalaka Venugopal Rao
 Cota Ramaswami
 Ambati Rayudu

Athletics
 Kodi Rammurthy Naidu
 Neelapu Rami Reddy – former sprinter and athletics champion

Chess
 Dronavalli Harika
 Pendyala Harikrishna
 Koneru Humpy

Weightlifting
 Karnam Malleswari – Olympic bronze medallist

Hockey
 Mukesh Kumar

Badminton
 Chetan Anand
 Pullela Gopichand

Other sports
 Achanta Sharath Kamal – table tennis
 A. Ramana Rao – volleyball

Music 

Traditional
 Kshetrayya
 Tallapaka Annamacharya
 Bhadradri Ramadasu
 Tyagaraja – of the trinity of Carnatic music

Classical
 Mangalampalli Balamuralikrishna
 Nedunuri Krishnamurthy
 Dwaram Venkataswamy Naidu
 Sripada Pinakapani
 Emani Sankara Sastry
 Nookala Chinna Satyanarayana
 U.Srinivas

Film score

 S. Rajeswara Rao – composer
 Ghantasala – singer, composer
 S P Balasubrahmanyam – singer
 K. Chakravarthy –  composer
 Jikki – singer
 S. Janaki – singer
 Koti – composer
 Nagur Babu (Mano) – singer
 Veturi – lyricist
 M. M. Keeravani – composer, lyricist, singer
 Ramana Gogula – composer
 Ramesh Naidu – composer
 Devi Sri Prasad – composer, singer
 S V Krishna Reddy – composer
 Satyam – composer
 Mani Sharma – composer
 Sirivennela Sitaramasastri – lyricist
 P. B. Sreenivas – singer
 Sunitha – singer
 Usha – singer
 P. Susheela – singer
 Master Venu – composer

Dance 
 Vempati Chinna Satyam
 Sidhendra Yogi – originator of the Kuchipudi dance style
 Raja and Radha Reddy – Kuchipudi, Padma Bhushan awardees
 Shobha Naidu – Kuchipudi, Padma Sri awardee
 Jayapa Nayudu

Cinema

Directors

 Raghupathi Venkaiah
 H. M. Reddy
 B. N. Reddy
 B. Nagi Reddy
 C. S. R. Anjaneyulu
 Bapu
 K Vishwanath
 Shyam Benegal
 L. V. Prasad
 Dasari Narayana Rao
 A. Kodandarami Reddy
 K. Raghavendra Rao
 S. V. Krishna Reddy
 V. N. Reddy
 Jandhyala
 E V V Satyanarayana
 S. S. Rajamouli
 Kodi Ramakrishna
 Trivikram Srinivas
 Puri Jagannadh
 Sukumar
 Sekhar Kammula
 Deva Katta
 Radhakrishna Jagarlamudi (Krish)
 N.Shankar
 Srinu Vaitla
 Krishna Vamsi
 Ram Gopal Varma
 V. V. Vinayak
 Surender Reddy

Producers
 Raghupathi Venkaiah Naidu
 B. N. Reddy
 B. Nagi Reddy
 L V Prasad
 Allu Aravind
 Vikram Krishna
 Murali Mohan
 M S Raju
 D. Ramanaidu
 M. S. Reddy
 Shyam Prasad Reddy
 Dil Raju
 Gopichand Lagadapati

Writers
 Acharya Aatreya
 Gopimohan
 Paruchuri Brothers
 Mullapudi Venkata Ramana
 Pingali Nagendra Rao
 Abburi Ravi
 B.V.S.Ravi
 Ajay Sastry
 Guna Sekhar
 Trivikram Srinivas
 Sukumar
 Kona Venkat
 Chandra Sekhar Yeleti

Actresses
 Savitri
 Sarada
 Bhanupriya
 Anjali Devi
 Devika
 Jamuna
 Sowcar Janaki
 Jaya Prada
 Jayasudha
 P. Kannamba
 Kavitha
 Krishnaveni
 Laya
 Bindu Madhavi
 Bhanumathi Ramakrishna
 Sameera Reddy
 Santhakumari
 Suryakantham
 Vanisri
 G. Varalakshmi
 S. Varalakshmi

Actors

 N. T. Rama Rao
 Akkineni Nageswara Rao
 S. V. Ranga Rao
 Sobhan Babu
 Ramana Reddy
 Relangi
 V. Nagayya
 Ghattamaneni Krishna
 Dasari Narayana Rao
 Gummadi
 Chiranjeevi
 Venkatesh
 Pawan Kalyan
 Mahesh Babu
 Jr. NTR
 Prabhas
 Ram Charan Teja
 Allu Arjun
 Ravi Teja
 Nithiin
 Nani
 Sai Dharam Tej
 Gopichand
 Jaggayya
 Kaikala Satyanarayana
 Nagarjuna
 Prabhakar
 Rajanala
 Krishnam Raju
 Vishal Krishna
 Mohan Babu
 Tarun Kumar
 Gopichand Lagadapati
 Allu Rama Lingaiah
 Murali Mohan
 Ranganath
 Gadde Rajendra Prasad
 J. V. Somayajulu
 Balakrishna
 Jagapathi Babu
 Raja Babu
 Srihari
 Ravi Teja
 Naga Chaitanya
 Venu

Music directors
 K. Chakravarthy
 Chakri
 S P Balasubramanyam
 Ghantasala
 Ramana Gogula
 M.M. Keeravani
 K M Radha Krishnan
 Ramesh Naidu
 Devi Sri Prasad
 Koti
 Saluri Rajeshwara Rao
 Chellapilla Satyam
 Mani Sharma
 Vandemataram Srinivas
 Vamsi
 Master Venu
 Vidyasagar

Journalists
 Manikonda Chalapathi Rau

Religion

Sanatana Dharma / Hinduism
 Tirumala Tirupati Devasthanams (TTD)

Buddhism
 Acharya Nagarjuna

Secular
 Sathya Sai Baba

Others
 Vijaya Lakshmi Emani (1958–2009) – social activist
 Aruna Miller – Maryland State Representative
 Laxman Reddy – bodybuilder, Mr. World 2010

See also 
 Lists of Indians by state
 Telugu people
 List of Telugu people

References 

Andhra Pradesh

People